is a Japanese football player for Roasso Kumamoto.

Club statistics
Updated to 23 February 2018.

References

External links

Profile at Shonan Bellmare
Profile at Fukushima United FC

1995 births
Living people
Association football people from Aichi Prefecture
People from Owariasahi, Aichi
Japanese footballers
J1 League players
J3 League players
Shonan Bellmare players
Fukushima United FC players
Roasso Kumamoto players
Association football midfielders